The Philippine constitutional plebiscite of 1973 occurred from 10 to 15 January which ratified the 1973 Constitution of the Philippines.

Background 
In 1970, 320 delegates were elected to a constitutional convention which began to meet in 1971.  On 23 September 1972, President Ferdinand Marcos issued the formal declaration of martial law which led to the arrests of 11 conveners, alongside government critics and journalists, by the Armed Forces of the Philippines and the Philippine Constabulary.  The convention then re-convened and wrote a constitution in line with what President Ferdinand Marcos wanted, at least, according to many critics and victims of martial law.

Marcos issued Presidential Decree No. 86 calling for the cancellation of the plebiscite and instituted barangays' citizens' assemblies to ratify the new constitution by a plebiscite from 10–15 January 1973. Alongside the utilization of citizens' assemblies, the voting age was also reduced to 15. Voting in citizens' assemblies took place through viva voce voting, similar to parliamentary procedure, rather than the standard secret ballot that had been used up until that point.

During the course of voting, military men were stationed in prominent positions to intimidate voters. And mayors were given quotas for "yes" votes, while "no" votes were occasionally not recorded. Official figures state that 90% of voters voted in favor of adopting the new constitution, although some communities did not partake in voting.

On 17 January 1973, Marcos issued Proclamation No. 1102 certifying and proclaiming that the 1973 Constitution had been ratified by the Filipino people and thereby was in effect.

These results were challenged during the Ratification Cases heard by the Supreme Court of the Philippine in 1973. The court upheld the results and the ratification of the 1973 Constitution.

Results

Approving the constitution

Having another plebiscite to ratify the constitution

See also
Constitution of the Philippines
Elections in the Philippines
Politics of the Philippines
Martial Law under Ferdinand Marcos
Ratification Cases

References

External links
 Full text of the 1973 Philippine Constitution
Official website of the Commission on Elections
Constitution Day
The Fall of Martial Law

1973 elections in the Philippines
1973 referendums
Constitutional referendums in the Philippines
Presidency of Ferdinand Marcos